Thirumittacode-I  is a village in the Palakkad district, state of Kerala, India. Together with Thirumittacode-II, it is administered by the Thirumittacode gram panchayat near Cheruthuruthi-Perumbilavu Road.

Demographics
 India census, Thirumittacode-I had a population of 19,124 with 9,102 males and 10,041 females.

References

Thirumittacode-I